The Men's Heavyweight competition was a class featured  at the 2009 World Taekwondo Championships, and was held at the Ballerup Super Arena in Copenhagen, Denmark on October 14. Heavyweights were over of 87 kilograms in body mass.

Medalists

Results
Legend
DQ — Won by disqualification

Finals

Top half

Section 1

Section 2

Bottom half

Section 3

Section 4

References
Draw
 Official Report

Men's 99